Aloo gobi, alu gobi or aloo gobhi is a vegetarian dish from the Indian subcontinent made with potatoes (aloo), cauliflower (gobhi), and Indian spices. It is popular in Indian cuisine. It is yellowish in colour due to the use of turmeric, and occasionally contains black cumin and curry leaves. Other common ingredients include garlic, ginger, onion, coriander stalks, tomato, peas, black pepper, asafoetida and cumin. There are a number of variations and similar dishes.

See also
 Aloo gosht
 Bombay potatoes
 List of potato dishes

References

Rajasthani cuisine
Uttar Pradeshi cuisine
Bihari cuisine
Indian curries
Bengali cuisine
North Indian cuisine
Pakistani curries
Potato dishes
Punjabi cuisine
Brassica oleracea dishes
Indian vegetable dishes
Pakistani vegetable dishes
Vegetarian cuisine